The Vasai Virar Municipal Corporation Marathon (VVMCM) is a running event that usually happen in December in Vasai-Virar, Maharashtra, India. The event is primarily sponsored by the Vasai-Virar Municipal Corporation and has changed name several times for secondary title sponsors.

The event started as a state level event in 2011 and has grown into one of the country's premier national level running event, offering the highest prize money for Indian athletes, both professional and amateur.

The 10th edition of Vasai Virar Mayor's Marathon will be held on December 11, 2022.

Events

Full Marathon 
The Full Marathon (42.195 km) starts from Viva College (Virar, West) and also finishes at Viva College. Free transport facilities are available from Virar railway station for all Full Marathon participants.

Half Marathon 
The Half Marathon (21.097 km) starts from outside the Vasai Tahsildar Office, Opp. Vasai Court, Vasai Village will finishes at Viva College. Free Transport facilities to the start point is available from outside Vasai Road railway station.

Open Run   
The Open Run (11km & 5km) Starts from Viva College (Virar West) and also finishes at Viva College.

References

External links 
 

Sport in Vasai-Virar
Marathons in India
Recurring sporting events established in 2011
2011 establishments in Maharashtra